Beauty and the Beast is a 1991 American animated musical romantic fantasy film produced by Walt Disney Feature Animation and released by Walt Disney Pictures. The 30th Disney animated feature film and the third released during the Disney Renaissance period, it is based on the 1756 fairy tale of the same name by Jeanne-Marie Leprince de Beaumont (who was only credited in the French dub), while also containing ideas from the 1946 French film of the same name directed by Jean Cocteau. The film was directed by Gary Trousdale and Kirk Wise (in their feature directorial debuts) and produced by Don Hahn, from a screenplay by Linda Woolverton.

Beauty and the Beast focuses on the relationship between the Beast (voice of Robby Benson), a prince who is magically transformed into a monster and his servants into household objects as punishment for his arrogance, and Belle (voice of Paige O'Hara), a young woman whom he imprisons in his castle in exchange for her father. To break the curse, the Beast must learn to love Belle and earn her love in return before the last petal falls from an enchanted rose or else he will remain a monster forever. The film also features the voices of Richard White, Jerry Orbach, David Ogden Stiers, and Angela Lansbury.

Walt Disney first attempted to adapt Beauty and the Beast into an animated film during the 1930s and 1950s, but was unsuccessful. Following the success of The Little Mermaid (1989), Walt Disney Pictures decided to adapt the fairy tale, which Richard Purdum originally conceived as a non-musical period drama. After seeing a test reel, Disney chairman Jeffrey Katzenberg scrapped Purdum's idea and ordered that the film be a musical similar to The Little Mermaid instead. Lyricist Howard Ashman and composer Alan Menken wrote the film's songs. Ashman, who additionally served as the film's executive producer, died of AIDS-related complications six months before the film's release, and the film is thus dedicated to his memory.

Beauty and the Beast premiered as an unfinished film at the New York Film Festival on September 29, 1991, followed by its theatrical release as a completed film at the El Capitan Theatre on November 13. The film grossed $331 million at the box office worldwide on a $25 million budget and received widespread critical acclaim for its romantic narrative, animation (particularly the ballroom scene), characters, and musical numbers. Beauty and the Beast won the Golden Globe Award for Best Motion Picture – Musical or Comedy, the first animated film to ever win that category. It also became the first animated film to be nominated for the Academy Award for Best Picture at the 64th Academy Awards (ultimately losing to The Silence of the Lambs), where it won the Academy Award for Best Original Score and Best Original Song for its title song and received additional nominations for Best Original Song and Best Sound. In April 1994, Beauty and the Beast became Disney's first animated film to be adapted into a Broadway musical, which ran until 2007.

An IMAX version of the film was released in 2002 and included the new song "Human Again", originally an eight-minute storyboarded musical sequence ultimately replaced with Something There, but later revised in the 1994 musical as a five-minute piece. That same year, the film was selected for preservation in the United States National Film Registry by the Library of Congress for being "culturally, historically, or aesthetically significant". After the success of the 3D re-release of The Lion King, the film was reissued in 3D in 2012. A live-action adaptation of the film directed by Bill Condon was released on March 17, 2017. In 2014, Time magazine ranked Beauty and the Beast as the greatest film of the Disney Renaissance and one of the greatest animated films of all time.

Plot

An enchantress disguised as a beggar woman visits a castle and offers an enchanted rose to a cruel and selfish prince in exchange for shelter from a storm. When he refuses, she reveals her true identity and transforms the prince into a beast and his servants into household objects before placing a spell on the castle itself. She warns the prince that the spell will only be broken if he learns to love another and be loved in return before the last petal falls, or he will remain a beast forever.

Several years later, in a nearby village, Belle, the book-loving daughter of an eccentric inventor named Maurice, dreams of adventure. She frequently tries avoiding Gaston, a narcissistic hunter who wants to marry her because of her beauty. On route to a fair to showcase his latest invention, an automatic wood-chopper, Maurice gets lost in the forest and seeks refuge in the Beast's castle; there, the Beast finds Maurice and imprisons him for trespassing. When Maurice's horse returns alone, Belle ventures out searching for her father, finding him locked in the castle dungeon. The Beast agrees to free Maurice if she takes his place as prisoner.

Belle befriends the castle's servants: Lumière the candelabra, Cogsworth the clock, Mrs. Potts the teapot, and her son Chip, the teacup; they serve her a dinner through song. When she wanders into the forbidden west wing and finds the rose, the Beast catches her and angrily forces her to flee the castle. In the woods, she is ambushed by a pack of wolves, but the Beast rescues her and is injured in the process. As Belle nurses his injuries, a rapport develops between them and as time passes, they begin to fall in love.

Meanwhile, Maurice returns to the village and fails to convince the townsfolk of Belle's predicament. Hearing Maurice's statements about the Beast, Gaston hatches a plan: He bribes Monsieur D'Arque, the warden of the town's insane asylum, to have Maurice locked up as a lunatic. Gaston will use this to force Belle into marrying him in exchange for Maurice's release. Before they can act, however, Maurice leaves for the castle to attempt a rescue alone.

After sharing a romantic dance with the Beast, Belle uses the Beast's magic mirror to check on her father and sees him collapsing in the woods. The Beast releases her to save Maurice, giving her the mirror as a memento. After Belle takes her father to the village, a band of villagers led by Gaston arrives to detain Maurice. Belle uses the mirror to show the Beast to the townsfolk, proving her father's sanity. Realizing that Belle loves the Beast, a jealous Gaston locks Belle and her father in the cellar, and rallies the villagers to help him slay the Beast. Chip, who arrived at their house as a stowaway, activates Maurice's wood-chopping machine, freeing Maurice and Belle from the cellar.

When the villagers arrive at the castle, the Beast's servants fend them off. Meanwhile, Gaston attacks the Beast, who is too depressed from Belle's departure to fight back but regains his spirit upon seeing Belle return. He defeats Gaston but spares his life before reuniting with Belle. However, Gaston fatally stabs the Beast with a knife before losing his footing and falling to his death. The Beast dies in Belle's arms before the last petal falls. Belle tearfully professes her love to the Beast, and the spell is broken, reviving the Beast and restoring his human form along with his servants and castle. The Prince and Belle host a ball for the kingdom, where they dance happily.

Voice cast

 Paige O'Hara as Belle, a bibliophilic young woman who seeks adventure, and offers her own freedom to the Beast in return for her father's. In an effort to "enhance" the character from the original story, the filmmakers felt that Belle should be "unaware" of her own beauty and made her "a little odd". Wise recalls casting O'Hara because of a "unique tone" she had, "a little bit of Judy Garland", after whose appearance Belle was modeled. James Baxter and Mark Henn served as the supervising animators for Belle.
 Robby Benson as the Beast, a young prince who is transformed into a talking beast by an enchantress as punishment for his arrogance and selfishness. The animators drew him with the head structure and horns of an American bison; the arms and body of a bear; the eyebrows of a gorilla; the teeth and mane of a lion; the tusks of a wild boar; and the legs and tail of a wolf. Chris Sanders, one of the film's storyboard artists and visual development artists, drafted the designs for the Beast and came up with designs based on birds, insects, and fish before coming up with something close to the final design. Glen Keane, supervising animator for the Beast, refined the design by going to the zoo and studying the animals on which the Beast was based. Benson commented, "There's a rage and torment in this character I've never been asked to use before." The filmmakers commented that "everybody was big fee-fi-fo-fum and gravelly" while Benson had the "big voice and the warm, accessible side" so that "you could hear the prince beneath the fur".
 Richard White as Gaston, a vain hunter who vies for Belle's hand in marriage and is determined not to let anyone else win her heart. He serves as a foil personality to the Beast, who was once as egotistical as Gaston prior to his transformation. Gaston's supervising animator, Andreas Deja, was pressed by Jeffrey Katzenberg to make Gaston handsome in contrast to the traditional appearance of a Disney villain, an assignment he found difficult at first. In the beginning, Gaston is depicted as more of a narcissist than a villain, but later he threatens to put Maurice in a mental institution if Belle does not marry him, and eventually leads all the villagers to kill the Beast, enraged that Belle would love a beast more than him.
 Jerry Orbach as Lumière, the kind-hearted but rebellious French-accented maître d' of the Beast's castle, who has been transformed into a candelabra. He has a habit of disobeying his master's strict rules, sometimes causing tension between them, but the Beast often turns to him for advice. He is depicted as flirtatious, as he is frequently seen with the Featherduster and immediately takes a liking to Belle. A running gag throughout the film is Lumière burning Cogsworth. Nik Ranieri served as the supervising animator for Lumière.
 David Ogden Stiers as Cogsworth, the Beast's majordomo, the head butler of the household staff and Lumière's best friend, who has been turned into a mantel clock. He is extremely loyal to the Beast so as to save himself and anyone else any trouble, often leading to friction between himself and Lumière. Will Finn served as the supervising animator for Cogsworth. Stiers also narrates the prologue.
 Angela Lansbury as Mrs. Potts, the castle cook, turned into a teapot, who takes a motherly attitude toward Belle. The filmmakers went through several names for Mrs. Potts, such as "Mrs. Chamomile", before Ashman suggested the use of simple and concise names for the household objects. David Pruiksma served as the supervising animator for Mrs. Potts.
 Bradley Pierce as Chip, Mrs. Potts' son, who has been transformed into a teacup. Originally intended to only have one line, the filmmakers were impressed with Pierce's performance and expanded the character's role significantly, eschewing a mute Music Box character. Pruiksma also served as the supervising animator for Chip.
 Rex Everhart as Maurice, Belle's inventor father. The villagers see him as insane for crafting devices believed impossible to construct in reality, but his loyal daughter believes he will be famous one day. Ruben A. Aquino served as the supervising animator for Maurice.
 Jesse Corti as LeFou, Gaston's often abused yet loyal and bumbling sidekick. He looks up to Gaston as his hero, and sings a song with the other villagers to cheer him up. His name is French for "The Madman" and also a phonetic play on "The Fool". Chris Wahl served as the supervising animator for LeFou.
 Jo Anne Worley as the Wardrobe, the castle's authority over fashion, and a former opera singer, who has been turned into a wardrobe. The character of Wardrobe was introduced by visual development artist Sue C. Nichols to the then entirely male cast of servants, and was originally a more integral character named "Madame Armoire". Wardrobe is known as "Madame de la Grande Bouche" (Madame Big Mouth) in the stage adaptation of the film and is the only major enchanted object character whose human form does not appear in the film. Tony Anselmo served as the supervising animator for the Wardrobe.
 Hal Smith as Philippe, Belle's horse. Russ Edmonds served as the supervising animator for Philippe.
 Mary Kay Bergman and Kath Soucie as the Bimbettes, a trio of village maidens who constantly fawn over Gaston, known as the "Silly Girls" in the stage adaptation.
 Jack Angel, Phil Proctor, Bill Farmer, and Patrick Pinney as Tom, Dick, Stanley, and Gramps, respectively, Gaston and LeFou's circle of friends.
 Brian Cummings as the Stove, the castle's chef who has been transformed into a stove. He is named Chef Bouche in 1998's Belle's Magical World.
 Alvin Epstein as the Bookseller, the owner of a book shop in Belle's village.
 Tony Jay as Monsieur D'Arque, the sadistic warden of the Asylum de Loons. Gaston bribes him to help in his plan to blackmail Belle.
 Alec Murphy as the Baker, the owner of a bakery in Belle's village.
 Kimmy Robertson as the Featherduster, a maid and Lumière's sweetheart, who has been turned into a feather duster. She is never mentioned by name in the 1991 film (listed as Featherduster in the credits); Babette is the name given to this character later in the 1994 stage adaptation of the film; Fifi in the 1998 animated musical film Belle's Magical World and Plumette in the 2017 live-action remake.
 Frank Welker as Sultan, the castle's pet dog turned into a footstool.

Production

Early versions
After the success of Snow White and the Seven Dwarfs in 1937, Walt Disney sought out other stories to adapt into feature films, with Beauty and the Beast being among the stories he considered. Attempts to develop the Beauty and the Beast story into a film were made in the 1930s and 1950s, but were ultimately given up because it "proved to be a challenge" for the story team. Peter M. Nichols states Disney may later have been discouraged by Jean Cocteau having already done his 1946 version.

Decades later, during the production of Who Framed Roger Rabbit in 1987, the Disney studio resurrected Beauty and the Beast as a project for the satellite animation studio it had set up in London, England to work on Roger Rabbit. Richard Williams, who had directed the animated portions of Roger Rabbit, was approached to direct but declined in favor of continuing work on his long-gestating project The Thief and the Cobbler. In his place, Williams recommended his colleague, English animation director Richard Purdum, and work began under producer Don Hahn on a non-musical version of Beauty and the Beast set in 19th-century France. At the behest of Disney CEO Michael Eisner, Beauty and the Beast became the first Disney animated film to use a screenwriter. This was an unusual move for an animated film, which is traditionally developed on storyboards rather than in a scripted form. Linda Woolverton wrote the original draft of the story before storyboarding began, and worked with the story team to retool and develop the film.

Script rewrite and musicalization

Upon seeing the initial storyboard reels in 1989, Walt Disney Studios chairman Jeffrey Katzenberg was dissatisfied with Purdum's idea and ordered that the film be scrapped and started over from scratch. A few months after starting anew, Purdum resigned as director. The studio had approached John Musker and Ron Clements to direct the film, but they turned down the offer, saying they were "tired" after just having finished directing Disney's recent success The Little Mermaid. Katzenberg then hired first-time feature directors Kirk Wise and Gary Trousdale. Wise and Trousdale had previously directed the animated sections of Cranium Command, a short film for a Disney EPCOT theme park attraction. In addition, wanting another musical film, Katzenberg asked songwriters Howard Ashman and Alan Menken, who had written the song score for The Little Mermaid, to turn Beauty and the Beast into a Broadway-style musical film in the same vein as Mermaid. Ashman, who at the time had learned he was dying of complications from AIDS, had been working with Disney on a pet project of his, Aladdin, and only reluctantly agreed to join the struggling production team. To accommodate Ashman's failing health, pre-production of Beauty and the Beast was moved from London to the Residence Inn in Fishkill, New York, close to Ashman's New York City home. Here, Ashman and Menken joined Wise, Trousdale, Hahn, and Woolverton in retooling the film's script. Since the original story had only two major characters, the filmmakers enhanced them, added new characters in the form of enchanted household items who "add warmth and comedy to a gloomy story" and guide the audience through the film, and added a "real villain" in the form of Gaston.

These ideas were somewhat similar to elements of the 1946 French film version of Beauty and the Beast, which introduced the character of Avenant, an oafish suitor somewhat similar to Gaston, as well as inanimate objects coming to life in the Beast's castle. The animated objects were, however, given distinct personalities in the Disney version. By early 1990, Katzenberg had approved the revised script, and storyboarding began again. The production flew story artists back and forth between California and New York for storyboard approvals from Ashman, though the team was not told the reason why.

Casting and recording
Disney had originally considered casting Jodi Benson from The Little Mermaid as Belle. They eventually decided upon Broadway actress and singer Paige O'Hara in favor of having a heroine who sounded "more like a woman than a girl". According to co-director Kirk Wise, O'Hara was given the role because she "had a unique quality, a tone she would hit that made her special", reminiscent to that of American actress and singer Judy Garland. O'Hara, who, after reading about the film in The New York Times, competed for the role against 500 hopefuls, believes the fact that lyricist Howard Ashman admired her cast recording of the musical Show Boat proved integral in her being cast. Laurence Fishburne, Val Kilmer and Mandy Patinkin were originally considered to voice the Beast, the role was eventually given to actor Robby Benson. John Cleese was originally intended to voice Cogsworth, but later turned it down to voice Cat. R. Waul in the Universal Pictures animated film An American Tail: Fievel Goes West, and the role was eventually given to David Ogden Stiers. Julie Andrews was originally considered to voice Mrs. Potts, but the role was eventually given to Angela Lansbury.

Animation

Production of Beauty and the Beast was to be completed on a compressed timeline of two years rather than the traditional four-year Disney Feature Animation production schedule; this was due to the loss of production time spent developing the earlier Purdum version of the film. Most of the production was done at the main Feature Animation studio, housed in the Air Way facility in Glendale, California. A smaller team at the Disney-MGM Studios theme park in Lake Buena Vista, Florida assisted the California team on several scenes, particularly the "Be Our Guest" number.

Beauty and the Beast was the second film, after The Rescuers Down Under, produced using CAPS (Computer Animation Production System), a digital scanning, ink, paint, and compositing system of software and hardware developed for Disney by Pixar. The software allowed for a wider range of colors, as well as soft shading and colored line effects for the characters, techniques lost when the Disney studio abandoned hand inking for xerography in the early 1960s. CAPS/ink & paint also allowed the production crew to simulate multiplane effects: placing characters and/or backgrounds on separate layers and moving them towards/away from the camera on the Z-axis to give the illusion of depth, as well as altering the focus of each layer.

In addition, CAPS/ink & paint allowed an easier combination of hand-drawn art with computer-generated imagery, which before had to be plotted to animation paper and then xeroxed and painted traditionally. This technique was put to significant use during the "Beauty and the Beast" waltz sequence, in which Belle and Beast dance through a computer-generated ballroom as the camera dollies around them in simulated 3D space. The filmmakers had originally decided against the use of computers in favor of traditional animation, but later, when the technology had improved, decided it could be used for the one scene in the ballroom. Before that, CGI environments had first been printed out as wireframe, but this was the first time Disney made use of 3D rendering. The success of the ballroom sequence helped convince studio executives to further invest in computer animation. The technology hardware that was used for the CGI was SGI, and the software that was used is Pixar's RenderMan.

The final dance between Belle and the Prince was reused from the final dance sequence between Princess Aurora and Prince Phillip from the 1959 film Sleeping Beauty. According to Trousdale, this was done because production of the film was nearing the deadline, and this was the easiest way to do that sequence.

Music

Ashman and Menken wrote the Beauty song score during the pre-production process in Fishkill, the opening operetta-styled "Belle" being their first composition for the film. Other songs included "Be Our Guest", sung (in its original version) to Maurice by the objects when he becomes the first visitor to eat at the castle in a decade, "Gaston", a solo for the swaggering villain and his bumbling sidekick, "Human Again", a song describing Belle and Beast's growing love from the objects' perspective, the love ballad "Beauty and the Beast (Tale as Old as Time)" and the climactic "The Mob Song". As story and song development came to a close, full production began in Burbank while voice and song recording began in New York City. The Beauty songs were mostly recorded live with the orchestra and the voice cast performing simultaneously rather than overdubbed separately, in order to give the songs a cast album-like "energy" the filmmakers and songwriters desired.

During the course of production, many changes were made to the structure of the film, necessitating the replacement and re-purposing of songs. After screening a mostly animated version of the "Be Our Guest" sequence, story artist Bruce Woodside suggested that the objects should be singing the song to Belle rather than her father. Wise and Trousdale agreed, and the sequence and song were retooled to replace Maurice with Belle. The film's title song went through a noted bit of uncertainty during production. Originally conceived as a rock-oriented song, it was changed to a slow, romantic ballad. Howard Ashman and Alan Menken asked Angela Lansbury to perform the song, but she did not think her voice was suited for the melody. When she voiced her doubts, Menken and Ashman asked her for at least one take and told her to perform the song as she saw fit. Lansbury reportedly reduced everyone in the studio to tears with her rendition, nailing the song in the one take asked of her. This version went on to win the Oscar for Best Original Song. "Human Again" was dropped from the film before animation began, as its lyrics caused story problems about the timeline over which the story takes place. This required Ashman and Menken to write a new song in its place. "Something There", in which Belle and Beast sing (via voiceover) of their growing fondness for each other, was composed late in production and inserted into the script in place of "Human Again".

Menken would later revise "Human Again" for inclusion in the 1994 Broadway stage version of Beauty and the Beast, and another revised version of the song was added to the film itself in a new sequence created for the film's Special Edition re-release in 2002. Ashman died of AIDS-related complications at the age of 40 on March 14, 1991, eight months before the film's release. He never saw the finished film, though he did get to see it in its unfinished format. Ashman's work on Aladdin was completed by another lyricist, Tim Rice. Before Ashman's death, members of the film's production team visited him after the film's well-received first screening, with Don Hahn commenting that "the film would be a great success. Who'd have thought it?", to which Ashman replied with "I would." A tribute to the lyricist was included at the end of the credits crawl: "To our friend, Howard, who gave a mermaid her voice, and a beast his soul. We will be forever grateful. Howard Ashman: 1950–1991." A pop version of the "Beauty and the Beast" theme, performed by Céline Dion and Peabo Bryson over the end credits, was released as a commercial single from the film's soundtrack, supported with a music video. The Dion/Bryson version of "Beauty and the Beast" became an international pop hit and performed considerably well on charts around the world. The song became Dion's second single to land within the top-10 of the Billboard Hot 100, peaking at number nine. The song peaked at number three on the Billboard Hot Adult Contemporary chart. In Canada, "Beauty and the Beast" peaked at number two. Outside of North America, the song peaked within the top ten in New Zealand and the United Kingdom, while peaking within the top twenty in Australia, Netherlands, and Ireland. The song sold over a million copies worldwide. This version of the song was also nominated for Record of the Year, Song of the Year, and Best Pop Duo/Group Vocal Performance at the 35th Annual Grammy Awards, winning the latter.

Release

Work-in-progress and original theatrical run
In a first-time accomplishment for The Walt Disney Company, an unfinished version of Beauty and the Beast was shown at the New York Film Festival on September 29, 1991. The film was deemed a "work in progress" because roughly only 70% of the animation had been completed; storyboards and pencil tests were used in replacement of the remaining 30%. Additionally, certain segments of the film that had already been finished were reverted to previous stages of completion. At the end of the screening, Beauty and the Beast received a ten-minute-long standing ovation from the film festival audience. The completed film was also screened out of competition at the 1992 Cannes Film Festival. The finished film premiered at the El Capitan Theatre in Hollywood on November 13, 1991, beginning a limited release before expanding wide on November 22, along with An American Tail: Fievel Goes West.

Re-issues
The film was restored and remastered for its New Year's Day, 2002 re-release in IMAX theatres in a special-edition edit, including a new musical sequence. For this version of the film, much of the animation was cleaned up, a new sequence set to the deleted song "Human Again" was inserted into the film's second act, and a new digital master from the original CAPS production files was used to make the high-resolution IMAX film negative.

A sing along edition of the film, hosted by Jordin Sparks, was released in select theaters on September 29 and October 2, 2010. Prior to the showing of the film, Sparks showed an exclusive behind-the-scenes look at the newly restored film and the making of her new Beauty and the Beast music video. There was also commentary from producer Don Hahn, interviews with the cast and an inside look at how the animation was created.

A Disney Digital 3D version of the film, the second of a traditionally animated film, was originally scheduled to be released in US theatres on February 12, 2010, but the project was postponed, first to 2011 and then to 2012. On August 25, 2011, Disney announced that the 3D version of the film would make its American debut at Hollywood's El Capitan Theatre from September 2–15, 2011. Disney spent less than $10 million on the 3D conversion. After the successful 3D re-release of The Lion King, Disney announced a wide 3D re-release of Beauty and the Beast in North America beginning January 13, 2012.

Home media
On October 30, 1992, in the United States and Canada, Walt Disney Home Video (currently known as Walt Disney Studios Home Entertainment) released the film to VHS and LaserDisc as part of the Walt Disney Classics series, and later put it on moratorium on April 30, 1993, it was not included in the Walt Disney Masterpiece Collection line. The "work-in-progress" version screened at the New York Film Festival was also released on VHS and LaserDisc at this time; however, said version was the only one available on the latter format until the fall of 1993, when the completed theatrical version was released. This measure was to diminish the threat of video pirates making copies derived from the LaserDisc (which are not copy-protected) and selling them in international markets, where the film was yet to be available for home release. By October 1993, the VHS sold a record 20-22 million units. In 1993, the film was also released on home video in different countries, including the United Kingdom on September 20 of that year, and sold a record 8.5 million units.

Beauty and the Beast: Special Edition, as the enhanced version of the film released in IMAX/large-format is called, was released on a THX certified "Platinum Edition" two-disc DVD and VHS on October 8, 2002. The DVD set features three versions of the film: the extended IMAX Special Edition with the "Human Again" sequence added, the original theatrical version, and the New York Film Festival "work-in-progress" version. This release went to "Disney Vault" moratorium status in January 2003, along with its direct-to-video follow-ups Beauty and the Beast: The Enchanted Christmas and Belle's Magical World. The Special Edition DVD was released on November 2, 2002, in the United Kingdom, while the other 50 international territories released on Autumn 2002 as "Special Limited Edition".

The film was released from the vault on October 5, 2010, as the second of Disney's Diamond Editions, in the form of a three-disc Blu-ray Disc and DVD combination pack—the first release of Beauty and the Beast on home video in high-definition format. This edition consists of four versions of the film: the original theatrical version, an extended version, the New York Film Festival storyboard-only version, and a fourth iteration displaying the storyboards via picture-in-picture alongside the original theatrical version. Upon its first week of release, the Blu-ray sold 1.1 million units, topping the Blu-ray sales chart and finishing in third place on the combined Blu-ray and DVD sales chart for the week ending on October 10, 2010. It was the second-best-selling Blu-ray of 2010, behind Avatar. A two-disc DVD edition was released on November 23, 2010. A five-disc combo pack, featuring Blu-ray 3D, Blu-ray 2D, DVD and a digital copy, was released on October 4, 2011. The 3D combo pack is identical to the original Diamond Edition, except for the added 3D disc and digital copy. The Blu-ray release went into the Disney Vault along with the two sequels on April 30, 2012.

A 25th-anniversary Signature Edition was released on Digital HD September 6, 2016, and was followed by Blu-ray/DVD combo pack on September 20, 2016. Upon its first week of release on home media in the U.S., the film topped the Blu-ray Disc sales chart, and debuted at number 3 in the Nielsen VideoScan First Alert chart, which tracks overall disc sales, behind Teenage Mutant Ninja Turtles: Out of the Shadows and Captain America: Civil War. The film was released on 4K digital download and Ultra HD Blu-ray on March 10, 2020.

Reception

Box office
For its original theatrical run, Beauty and the Beast earned $9.6 million in its opening weekend, ranking in third place behind The Addams Family and Cape Fear. During its initial release in 1991, the film grossed $145.9 million in revenues in North America and $331.9 million worldwide. It ranked as the third-most successful film of 1991 in North America, surpassed only by the summer blockbusters Terminator 2: Judgment Day and Robin Hood: Prince of Thieves. At the time Beauty and the Beast was the most successful animated Disney film release, and the first animated film to reach $100 million in the United States and Canada in its initial run. In its IMAX re-release, it earned $25.5 million in North America and $5.5 million in other territories, for a worldwide total of $31 million. It also earned $9.8 million from its 3D re-release overseas. During the opening weekend of its North American 3D re-release in 2012, Beauty and the Beast grossed $17.8 million, coming in at the No. 2 spot, behind Contraband, and achieved the highest opening weekend for an animated film in January. The film was expected to make $17.5 million over the weekend; however, the results topped its forecast and the expectations of box office analysts. The re-release ended its run on May 3, 2012, and earned $47.6 million, which brought the film's total gross in North America to $219 million. It made an estimated $206 million in other territories, for a worldwide total of $425 million. It was the highest-grossing film in Italy, surpassing the 39 billion lira grossed by Johnny Stecchino.

Critical response
Upon its release, Beauty and the Beast received near-universal acclaim from critics and audiences alike for its animation, screenplay, characters, musical score, musical numbers, and voice acting. The website's critical consensus reads, "Enchanting, sweepingly romantic, and featuring plenty of wonderful musical numbers, Beauty and the Beast is one of Disney's most elegant animated offerings." The film also holds a score of 95/100 on Metacritic, which indicates the reviews as "universal acclaim". Audiences polled by CinemaScore gave the film a rare "A+" grade.

Janet Maslin of The New York Times praised the film with the following statement, "Two years ago, Walt Disney Pictures reinvented the animated feature, not only with an eye toward pleasing children, but also with an older, savvier audience in mind. Disney truly bridged a generation gap with The Little Mermaid ... Now, lightning has definitely struck twice with Beauty and the Beast." Awarding the film a perfect score of four stars, Roger Ebert of the Chicago Sun-Times compared Beauty and the Beast positively to Snow White and the Seven Dwarfs and Pinocchio, writing, "Beauty and the Beast reaches back to an older and healthier Hollywood tradition in which the best writers, musicians and filmmakers are gathered for a project on the assumption that a family audience deserves great entertainment, too." In 2001 Ebert again gave the IMAX re-release a full 4 out of 4 stars. James Berardinelli of ReelViews rated the film similarly while hailing it as "the finest animated movie ever made", writing, "Beauty and the Beast attains a nearly-perfect mix of romance, music, invention, and animation." The use of computer animation, particularly in the ballroom sequence, was singled out in several reviews as one of the film's highlights. Hal Hinson of The Washington Post gave the film a positive review, calling the film "A delightfully satisfying modern fable, a near-masterpiece that draws on the sublime traditions of the past while remaining completely in sync with the sensibility of its time." Janet Maslin of The New York Times gave the film a positive review, saying "It is a surprise, in a time of sequels and retreads, that the new film is so fresh and altogether triumphant in its own right." Dave Kehr of the Chicago Tribune gave the film three out of four stars, saying "Beauty and the Beast is certainly adequate holiday entertainment for children and their more indulgent parents ... But the film has little of the technical facility, vivid characterization and emotional impact of Disney past."

Jay Boyar of the Orlando Sentinel gave the film four out of five stars, saying "It's not an especially scary movie, but right from the start, you can tell that this Beauty and the Beast has a beauty of a bite." John Hartl of The Seattle Times gave the film three-and-a-half stars out of four, saying "It's exceptionally difficult to make an audience care for animated characters unless they're mermaids or anthropomorphized animals or insects, yet the Disney animators, with a big assist from the vocal talents of a superb cast, have pulled it off." Gene Siskel, also of the Chicago Tribune, gave the film four out of four stars, saying "Beauty and the Beast is one of the year's most entertaining films for both adults and children." On their Beauty and the Beast edition of Siskel & Ebert, both Siskel and Roger Ebert proclaimed that the film is "a legitimate contender for Oscar consideration as Best Picture of the Year". Michael Sragow of The New Yorker gave the film a positive review, saying "It's got storytelling vigor and clarity, bright, eclectic animation, and a frisky musical wit." Eric Smoodin writes in his book Animating Culture that the studio was trying to make up for earlier gender stereotypes with this film. Smoodin also states that, in the way it has been viewed as bringing together traditional fairy tales and feminism as well as computer and traditional animation, the film's "greatness could be proved in terms of technology narrative or even politics". Animation legend Chuck Jones praised the film, in a 1992 guest appearance on Later with Bob Costas he claimed he "Loved it. I think it should have won [Best Picture] ... I think the animation on the beast is one of the greatest pieces of animation I've seen".

Animation historian Michael Barrier wrote that Belle "becomes a sort of intellectual less by actually reading books, it seems, than by hanging out with them", but says that the film comes closer than other "Disney-studio" films to "accepting challenges of the kind that the finest Walt Disney features met". David Whitley writes in The Idea of Nature in Disney Animation that Belle is different from earlier Disney heroines in that she is mostly free from the burdens of domestic housework, although her role is somewhat undefined in the same way that "contemporary culture now requires most adolescent girls to contribute little in the way of domestic work before they leave home and have to take on the fraught, multiple responsibilities of the working mother". Whitley also notes other themes and modern influences, such as the film's critical view of Gaston's chauvinism and attitude towards nature, the cyborg-like servants, and the father's role as an inventor rather than a merchant.

Beauty and the Beast has been named one of Disney's most critically acclaimed films. In 2010, IGN named Beauty and the Beast as the greatest animated film of all time, directly ahead of WALL-E, The Incredibles, Toy Story 2, and The Iron Giant.

Most critics regard the 1991 animated film as superior to the 2017 live-action remake. Michael Phillips of the Chicago Tribune stated that the 1991 film "worked wonderfully because it was pure Broadway, written for the screen, blending comedy and romance and magic and just enough snark in the margins", while the 2017 remake got lost in translation since "The movie takes our knowledge and our interest in the material for granted. It zips from one number to another, throwing a ton of frenetically edited eye candy at the screen, charmlessly." Phillips also wrote of the 2017 film that "too often we're watching highly qualified performers, plus a few less conspicuously talented ones ..., stuck doing karaoke, or motion-capture work of middling quality". Dana Schwartz of the Observer criticized some of the 2017 film changes to characters such as the Beast and Gaston as regressive by watering down their distinguishing personalities from the 1991 film, further arguing that the added backstory to the characters in the 2017 version failed to "advance the plot or theme in any meaningful way". David Sims of The Atlantic wrote that the 2017 film "feels particularly egregious, in part, because it's so slavishly devoted to the original; every time it falls short of its predecessor (which is quite often), it's hard not to notice".

Accolades
 Alan Menken and Howard Ashman's song "Beauty and the Beast" won the Academy Award for Best Original Song, while Menken's score won the award for Best Original Score. Two other Menken and Ashman songs from the film, "Belle" and "Be Our Guest", were also nominated for Best Original Song. Beauty and the Beast was the first picture to receive three Academy Award nominations for Best Original Song, a feat that would be repeated by The Lion King (1994), Dreamgirls (2006), and Enchanted (2007). Academy rules have since been changed to limit each film to two nominations in this category, due to the consecutive unintentional failures of Dreamgirls and Enchanted to win the award.

The film was also nominated for Best Picture and Best Sound. It was the first animated film ever to be nominated for Best Picture, and remained the only animated film nominated until 2009 when the Best Picture field was widened to ten nominees, and it remains the only animated film nominated for the award when it had five nominees. It was the third Disney film ever to be nominated for Best Picture, following Mary Poppins (1964) and Dead Poets Society (1989). It became the first musical in twelve years to be nominated for the Academy Award for Best Picture of the Year, following All That Jazz (1979), and the last one to be nominated until Moulin Rouge! (2001), ten years later. It lost the Best Picture award to The Silence of the Lambs and the Best Sound award to Terminator 2: Judgment Day. With six nominations, the film currently shares the record for the most nominations for an animated film with WALL-E (2008), although, with three nominations in the Best Original Song category, Beauty and the Beasts nominations span only four categories, while WALL-Es nominations cover six individual categories.

While The Little Mermaid was the first to be nominated, Beauty and the Beast became the first animated film to win the Golden Globe Award for Best Motion Picture – Musical or Comedy. This feat was later repeated by The Lion King and Toy Story 2.

In 2002, Beauty and the Beast was added to the United States National Film Registry as being deemed "culturally, historically, or aesthetically significant". In June 2008, the American Film Institute revealed its "Ten Top Ten" lists of the best ten films in ten "classic" American film genres, based on polls of over 1,500 people from the creative community. Beauty and the Beast was acknowledged as the seventh-best film in the animation genre. In previous lists, it ranked number 22 on the institute's list of best musicals and number 34 on its list of the best romantic American films. On the list of the greatest songs from American films, Beauty and the Beast ranked number 62.

American Film Institute recognition:
 AFI's 100 Years...100 Movies – Nominated
 AFI's 100 Years...100 Passions – No. 34
 AFI's 100 Years...100 Heroes and Villains:
 Belle – Nominated Hero
 AFI's 100 Years...100 Songs:
 "Beauty and the Beast" – No. 62
 "Be Our Guest" – Nominated
 AFI's Greatest Movie Musicals – No. 22
 AFI's 100 Years...100 Movies (10th Anniversary Edition) – Nominated
 AFI's 10 Top 10 – No. 7 Animated film

Adaptations

Broadway musical

According to an article in the Houston Chronicle, "The catalyst for Disney's braving the stage was an article by The New York Times theater critic Frank Rich that praised Beauty and the Beast as 1991's best musical. Theatre Under The Stars (TUTS) executive director Frank Young had been trying to get Disney interested in a stage version of Beauty about the same time Eisner and Katzenberg were mulling over Rich's column. But Young couldn't seem to get in touch with the right person in the Disney empire. Nothing happened till the Disney execs started to pursue the project from their end. When they asked George Ives, the head of Actors Equity on the West Coast, which Los Angeles theater would be the best venue for launching a new musical, Ives said the best theater for that purpose would be TUTS. Not long after that, Disney's Don Frantz and Bettina Buckley contacted Young, and the partnership was under way." A stage condensation of the film, directed by Robert Jess Roth and choreographed by Matt West, both of whom moved on to the Broadway development, had already been presented at Disneyland at what was then called the Videopolis stage. Beauty and the Beast premiered in a joint production of Theatre Under The Stars and Disney Theatricals at the Music Hall, Houston, Texas, from November 28, 1993, through December 26, 1993.

On April 18, 1994, Beauty and the Beast premiered on Broadway at the Palace Theatre in New York City to mixed reviews. The show transferred to the Lunt-Fontanne Theatre on November 11, 1999. The commercial success of the show led to productions in the West End, Toronto, and all over the world. The Broadway version, which ran for over a decade, received a Tony Award, and became the first of a whole line of Disney stage productions. The original Broadway cast included Terrence Mann as the Beast, Susan Egan as Belle, Burke Moses as Gaston, Gary Beach as Lumière, Heath Lamberts as Cogsworth, Tom Bosley as Maurice, Beth Fowler as Mrs. Potts, and Stacey Logan as Babette the feather duster. Many well-known actors and singers also starred in the Broadway production during its thirteen-year run, including Kerry Butler, Deborah Gibson, Toni Braxton, Andrea McArdle, Jamie-Lynn Sigler, Christy Carlson Romano, Ashley Brown, and Anneliese van der Pol as Belle; Chuck Wagner, James Barbour, and Jeff McCarthy as the Beast; Meshach Taylor, Patrick Page, Bryan Batt, Jacob Young, and John Tartaglia as Lumière; Marc Kudisch, Christopher Sieber, and Donny Osmond as Gaston; and Nick Jonas, Harrison Chad, and Andrew Keenan-Bolger as Chip. The show ended its Broadway run on July 29, 2007, after 46 previews and 5,461 performances. , it is Broadway's tenth-longest-running show in history.

Live-action film

In June 2014, Walt Disney Pictures announced that a live-action film adaptation of the original animated film was in the works, with Bill Condon directing and Evan Spiliotopoulos penning the screenplay. Condon originally planned on not only drawing inspiration from the animated film, but also to include most, if not all, of the Menken/Rice songs from the Broadway musical, with the intention of making the film as a "straight-forward, live-action, large-budget movie musical". In September 2014, it was announced that Stephen Chbosky would re-write the script. In January 2015, Emma Watson announced via her Facebook page that she would portray Belle in the live-action film. In March 2015, Dan Stevens, Luke Evans, Emma Thompson, Josh Gad, Audra McDonald, and Kevin Kline joined the film as the Beast, Gaston, Mrs. Potts, Lefou, Garderobe, and Maurice, respectively. The following month, Ian McKellen, Ewan McGregor, Stanley Tucci, and Gugu Mbatha-Raw joined the cast, as Cogsworth, Lumière, Cadenza, and Plumette, respectively. Composer Alan Menken returned to score the film's music, with new material written by Menken and Tim Rice. In June 2015, Menken said the film would not include the songs that were written for the Broadway musical. Filming began on May 18, 2015, in London, and at Shepperton Studios in Surrey. Production officially wrapped in August 2015. The film was released on March 17, 2017.

Beauty and the Beast at the Hollywood Bowl 
In 2018, a live concert celebration took place at the Hollywood Bowl, directed by Richard Kraft and Kenneth Shapiro. The cast included Zooey Deschanel as Belle, Anthony Evans as the Beast, Taye Diggs as Gaston, Kelsey Grammer as Lumiere, Rebel Wilson as LeFou, Jane Krakowski as Mrs. Potts, and Baraka May as Chip. They were accompanied by a live orchestra, singing songs from the original film.

Beauty and the Beast: A 30th Celebration

On July 5, 2022, ABC reported that a live-action/animation special was in development that would air on December 15, 2022, with Hamish Hamilton set to direct and Jon M. Chu as executive producer. ABC said that it would include live never-before-seen musical performances, along with new sets and costumes inspired by the classic story. On July 20, 2022, it was reported that H.E.R. was cast to play Belle. In September 2022, Josh Groban, Joshua Henry, and Rita Moreno, had been cast as the Beast, Gaston, and the narrator, respectively. David Alan Grier was later announced to play Cogsworth. During the month, Martin Short and Shania Twain entered final talks to play Lumiere and Mrs. Potts, respectively. Rizwan Manji, Jon Jon Briones, and Leo Abelo Perry complete the cast as LeFou, Maurice, and Chip, respectively. On December 12, 2022, D23 revealed that Paige O'Hara (the original voice of Belle), Richard White (the original voice of Gaston), and composer Alan Menken would cameo in the special as, respectively, the Bookseller, the Baker, and a piano player during "Belle".

Merchandise
Beauty and the Beast merchandise cover a wide variety of products, among them storybook versions of the film's story, a comic book based on the film published by Disney Comics, toys, children's costumes, and other items. In addition, the character of Belle has been integrated into the "Disney Princess" line of Disney's Consumer Products division, and appears on merchandise related to that franchise. In 1995, a live-action children's series entitled Sing Me a Story with Belle began running in syndication, remaining on the air through 1999. Two direct-to-video followups (which take place during the timeline depicted in the original film) were produced by Walt Disney Television Animation: Beauty and the Beast: The Enchanted Christmas in 1997 and Belle's Magical World in 1998; in contrast to the universal acclaim of the original, reception to the sequels was extremely negative. Disney on Ice produced an ice version of the movie that opened in 1992 in Lakeland, Florida. The show was such a huge commercial and critical success, touring around the world to sell-out crowds, that a television special was made when it toured Spain in 1994. The show ended its run in 2006, after 14 years.

Video games
The first video game based on the film was titled Beauty and the Beast: Belle's Quest and is an action platformer for the Sega Mega Drive/Genesis. Developed by Software Creations, the game was released in North America in 1993. It is one of two video games based on the film that Sunsoft published for the Mega Drive/Genesis, the other being Beauty and The Beast: Roar of the Beast. Characters from the film like Gaston can help the player past tricky situations. As Belle, the player must reach the Beast's castle and break the spell to live happily ever after. To succeed, she must explore the village, forest, castle, and snowy forest to solve puzzles and mini-games while ducking or jumping over enemies. Belle's health is represented by a stack of blue books, which diminishes when she touches bats, rats, and other hazards in the game. Extra lives, keys and other items are hidden throughout the levels. While there is no continue or game saving ability, players can use a code to start the game at any of the seven levels.

The second video game based on the film was titled Beauty and the Beast: Roar of the Beast and is a side-scrolling video game for the Genesis. As the Beast, the player must successfully complete several levels, based on scenes from the film, in order to protect the castle from invading villagers and forest animals and rescue Belle from Gaston.

The third and fourth video games based on the film are action platformers developed by Probe Software and published by Hudson Soft. One, titled Beauty and the Beast, was released in Europe in 1994 for the NES, while the other, Disney's Beauty and the Beast, was released in North America in July 1994 and in Europe on February 23, 1995, for the SNES. The entire games are played through the perspective of the Beast. As the Beast, the player must get Belle to fall in love so that the curse cast upon him and his castle will be broken. The final boss of the game is Gaston. The Beast can walk, jump, swipe, stomp, super stomp, and roar, the last of which is used to both damage enemies and reveal hidden objects.

The fifth video game based on the film was titled Disney's Beauty and the Beast: A Board Game Adventure and is a Disney Boardgame adventure for the Game Boy Color. It was released on October 25, 1999.

The video game series Kingdom Hearts features a world based on the film, named "Beast's Castle", along with several of the film's characters. In the first game, the world has been destroyed and Belle kidnapped by the Heartless, led by Maleficent, but the Beast travels to Maleficent's stronghold and works with Sora to defeat Maleficent and rescue Belle and the other captured princesses. In Kingdom Hearts II, the world has since been restored following Ansem's defeat, but Beast and Belle are having difficulties due to the enigmatic Xaldin of Organization XIII attempting to bring out the Beast's darker side in order to turn him into a Heartless and a Nobody, but the Beast eventually comes to his senses and works with Sora once again to defeat Xaldin once and for all. In the game's ending credits, the Beast turns back into the Prince. In Kingdom Hearts: 358/2 Days, the world is featured as a playable level but the story is not essential to the main plot. In Kingdom Hearts χ, the world is featured again, this time as a hallucination that follows the plot of the movie more closely. The characters featured in the series are Beast, Belle, Lumiere, Gaston, Cogsworth, Mrs. Potts, Chip, Maurice, and the Wardrobe. After Gaston is defeated, the Beast transforms back into the Prince. Gaston does not appear in Kingdom Hearts II, the world's primary antagonist being Xaldin, an original character created for the series, but who shares several traits with Forte, the main antagonist of Beauty and the Beast: The Enchanted Christmas.

Sequels
The success of the film spawned three direct-to-video sequels: Beauty and the Beast: The Enchanted Christmas (1997) and Beauty and the Beast: Belle's Magical World (1998), and Belle's Tales of Friendship (1999), all of which take place in the timeline of the original. This was followed by a live-action spin-off television series, Sing Me a Story with Belle.

Theme park attraction
 A dark ride based on the film, Enchanted Tale of Beauty and the Beast, opened at Tokyo Disneyland in 2020.

See also 
 List of Disney theatrical animated feature films
 List of Disney animated films based on fairy tales

Notes

References

External links

 
 
 
 
 
 
 
 
 
 
 Beauty and the Beast essay by Daniel Eagan in America's Film Legacy: The Authoritative Guide to the Landmark Movies in the National Film Registry, A&C Black, 2010 , pages 807-808 

1990s American animated films
1990s children's animated films
1990s English-language films
1991 comedy-drama films
1990s musical drama films
1990s romantic fantasy films
1990s romantic musical films
1991 animated films
1991 directorial debut films
1991 fantasy films
1991 musical films
1991 films
3D re-releases
American animated fantasy films
American comedy-drama films
American musical fantasy films
American romantic fantasy films
American romantic musical films
American animated feature films
Animated musical films
Animated romance films
Annie Award winners
Beauty and the Beast (franchise)
Best Animated Feature Annie Award winners
Best Musical or Comedy Picture Golden Globe winners
Disney Princess films
Disney Renaissance
Films about curses
Films about princes
Films about princesses
Animated films about shapeshifting
Films about witchcraft
Films adapted into comics
Films adapted into plays
Films based on Beauty and the Beast
Films directed by Gary Trousdale
Films directed by Kirk Wise
Films produced by Don Hahn
Films scored by Alan Menken
Films set in castles
Animated films set in France
Films set in the 18th century
Films that won the Best Original Score Academy Award
Films that won the Best Original Song Academy Award
Films with screenplays by Chris Sanders
Films with screenplays by Joe Ranft
Films with screenplays by Linda Woolverton
Films with screenplays by Brenda Chapman
IMAX films
Resurrection in film
United States National Film Registry films
Walt Disney Animation Studios films
Walt Disney Pictures animated films
Films about father–daughter relationships
Films with screenplays by Burny Mattinson